The Brunndöbra is a river of Saxony, Germany. It is a tributary of the river Zwota. It flows through the town Klingenthal.

See also
List of rivers of Saxony

Rivers of Saxony
Klingenthal
Rivers of Germany